Levente Apagyi (born 18 December 1993) is a Hungarian sprint canoeist.

He won a medal at the 2019 ICF Canoe Sprint World Championships.

References

1993 births
Living people
Hungarian male canoeists
ICF Canoe Sprint World Championships medalists in kayak
Canoeists from Budapest
21st-century Hungarian people